The 1982 Orkney Islands Council election, the third election to Orkney Islands Council, was held on 4 May 1982 as part of the wider 1982 Scottish regional elections. 

The election saw the Independents take all save one of the seats on the council as the Orkney Movement contested its first election, winning one seat.  Two other Orkney Movement members were elected as independent candidates.

Results

Ward Results

References

Orkney
Orkney Islands Council elections